Carlos Toledo may refer to:

Carlos Toledo Plata (1932–1984), Colombian politician
Carlos Altamirano Toledo (born 1946), Mexican politician
Carlos Humberto Toledo (1919–1980), Guatemalan footballer
Carlos Raymundo Toledo (born 1955), Mexican politician